The following highways are numbered 441:

Japan
 Japan National Route 441

United States
  U.S. Route 441
  Florida State Road 441
  Indiana State Road 441
  Louisiana Highway 441
  Maryland Route 441
  New York State Route 441
  Pennsylvania Route 441
  Puerto Rico Highway 441
  Tennessee State Route 441
  Wisconsin Highway 441